Brendan Peter Simms (born 1967, Dublin) is a Professor of the history of international relations in the Department of Politics and International Studies at the University of Cambridge.

Early life
Brendan Simms is the son of Anngret and David Simms, a professor of mathematics. He is also a grand-nephew of Brian Goold-Verschoyle, a member of the Communist Party of Ireland, who became a Soviet spy and died in a Soviet gulag in 1942.

Simms was brought up in the Roman Catholic faith. He studied at Trinity College Dublin, where he was elected a Scholar in 1986, before completing his doctoral dissertation, Anglo-Prussian relations, 1804–1806: The Napoleonic Threat, at Peterhouse, Cambridge, under the supervision of Tim Blanning in 1993.

Career
Simms became a Fellow of Peterhouse and now also serves as Professor of the History of European International Relations at the University of Cambridge, where he lectures and leads seminars, specializing in international history since 1945.

In addition to his academic work, Simms also serves as the president of the Henry Jackson Society, which advocates the view that supporting and promoting liberal democracy and liberal interventionism should be an integral part of Western foreign policy, and as President of the Project for Democratic Union, a Munich-based student-organised think tank.

He has advocated that the Eurozone should create a United States of Europe, and also that this should continue the traditions of the Holy Roman Empire, appointing an elected Emperor.

Europe: The Struggle for Supremacy
Norman Stone praised Europe: The Struggle for Supremacy as "lively and erudite". He also praised the book for the focus on Germany and Simms's knowledge of it though he qualifies it by saying Simms is stronger on the 18th century than the 20th century due to the volume of material to be covered in the latter.

Richard J. Evans was critical of the book, saying that Simms had overly favoured observations by A. J. P. Taylor of a Hobbsean view of European history, focusing on periods of strife while neglecting periods of cooperation between European states. Evans described the book as a "one-sided picture", adding that even Simms has to acknowledge that there were periods of cooperation.

Noel Malcolm praised Simms as "a historian of unusual range and ability", saying that "knowing what he wants to say is one of Simms’s strengths". On the whole Malcolm praised the book, though regarding Simms' emphasis on the primacy of foreign policy in European affairs, Malcolm did wonder if there may be counterexamples, such as those where the foreign/domestic distinction is less clear.

Hitler: Only the World Was Enough
British historian Richard J. Evans was also critical of Hitler: Only the World Was Enough, arguing that Simms's claim of Hitler embracing socialism does not stand up to examination. Simms cited violence of Nazi stormtroopers against conservatives, but Evans noted that socialists and communists were the overwhelming majority of the 200,000 Germans thrown into concentration camps during Hitler's first year in power. Simms claimed that Hitler's rhetoric was more anti-capitalist than anti-communist, but Evans shows that the anti-communist rhetoric dominated the political portion of Hitler's autobiographical manifesto Mein Kampf. Simms claims that Hitler had managed "to nationalise German industrialists by making them instruments of his political will" which Evans disputes – the reason Thyssen and Krupp supported him was that Hitler's rearmament policies were profitable for them.

Simms claimed that the Kristallnacht was caused by "Roosevelt’s hostility to Hitler and his defence of the Jews", that Operation Barbarossa "was to be a campaign of conquest and annihilation, for reasons more to do with Anglo-America than the Soviet Union itself" and that The Holocaust was "primarily driven … by his fear of Britain and the United States". Evans comments "All this is nonsense, and indeed, Simms is forced to contradict himself by the sheer weight of the evidence against his thesis." As an example of where Simms is forced to contradict himself Evans points to Operation Barbarossa, which Simms concedes to have been "part of a much broader ideological war against Bolshevism". Evans also points out that Hitler's genocidal anti-Semitism was based on a paranoid view that Jews were inherently disposed to subversion and conspiracy.

Evans summarizes the book with "In the end, Simms hasn’t written a biography in any meaningful sense of the word; he has written a tract that instrumentalises the past for present-day political purposes. As such, his book can be safely ignored by serious students of the Nazi era".

Works
The Struggle for Mastery in Germany, 1779–1850 (Palgrave MacMillan, 1998)
Unfinest Hour: Britain and the Destruction of Bosnia (Penguin, 2001)
Three Victories and a Defeat: The Rise and Fall of the First British Empire, 1714–1783 (Penguin, 2007)
Europe: The Struggle for Supremacy, 1453 to the Present (Allen Lane, 2013)
 The Longest Afternoon, The Four Hundred Men who Decided the Battle of Waterloo (Allen Lane, 2014)
 Britain's Europe: A Thousand Years of Conflict and Cooperation (Penguin, 2017)
 Donald Trump: The Making of a Worldview (I.B. Tauris & Co. Ltd., 2017)
 Hitler: A Global Biography (Basic Books, 2019)

See also
European History
Bosnian War
British Empire
T. C. W. Blanning

References

External links
Biography
Brady Lecture, London 2018

Living people
Alumni of Peterhouse, Cambridge
Fellows of Peterhouse, Cambridge
Fellows of the Royal Historical Society
20th-century Irish historians
21st-century Irish historians
Irish writers
Historians of the Napoleonic Wars
Members of the University of Cambridge faculty of history
Scholars of Trinity College Dublin
Place of birth missing (living people)
1967 births